The 1982 Syracuse Orangemen football team represented Syracuse University during the 1982 NCAA Division I-A football season. The team was led by second-year head coach Dick MacPherson and played their home games in the Carrier Dome in Syracuse, New York. Syracuse finished the season with a 2–9 record.

Schedule

References

Syracuse
Syracuse Orange football seasons
Syracuse Orangemen football